Uniküla may refer to several places in Estonia:

Uniküla, Ida-Viru County, village in Lüganuse Parish, Ida-Viru County
Uniküla, Tartu County, village in Kastre Parish, Tartu County
Uniküla, Valga County, village in Valga Parish, Valga County